Isobutylamine is an organic chemical compound (specifically, an amine) with the formula (CH3)2CHCH2NH2, and occurs as a colorless liquid. Isobutylamine is one of the four isomeric amines of butane, the others being n-butylamine, sec-butylamine and tert-butylamine. It is the decarboxylated form of the amino acid valine, and the product of the metabolism thereof by the enzyme valine decarboxylase.

Isobutylamine is an odorant binding to TAAR3 in mice and can trigger sexual behaviour in male mice dependent on the cluster of TAAR2 through TAAR9.

References

Alkylamines